"Swag Surfin" is the debut single by American hip hop group Fast Life Yungstaz. It is featured on their debut album Jamboree and is produced by K.E. on the Track.

It is the unofficial anthem of the WNBA's Washington Mystics and was played at the game in which the team won its first championship. "Swag Surfin'" also became synonymous with the Chicago Bears' post-game locker room celebration, nicknamed "Club Dub", under head coach Matt Nagy in 2018 and 2019.
The song was sampled by Beyoncé for her Coachella performance Homecoming: The Live Album with the song Drunk in Love.

Remixes
DJ Self put together a remix that features American rappers Fabolous, Juelz Santana, Red Cafe, and Maino.

Lil Wayne recorded a freestyle for his mixtape No Ceilings.

Music video
The music video was released online in January 2009. Kia Shine and Stuey Rock make cameo appearances.

Charts

Weekly charts

Year-end charts

Certifications

References

2008 songs
2009 debut singles
Southern hip hop songs
Song articles with missing songwriters
Song recordings produced by K.E. on the Track